List of seaweeds of South Africa may refer to one of:
List of green seaweeds of South Africa
List of brown seaweeds of South Africa
List of red seaweeds of South Africa